José Martín Leitón Rodríguez (born August 6, 1993) is a Costa Rican footballer who plays for Municipal Grecia.

Career

Beginnings
Leitón grew up in Moravia, Costa Rica. He had no formal football education so he learned how to play in the street. After a strong performance in an amateur tournament in San Jerónimo de Moravia Leitón's brother managed to get him a trial with Deportivo Saprissa. Leitón did not know how to run the drills for the club and he was corrected repeatedly by the coach. The coaches at Saprissa told Leitón that they would call him back in a few days about with their decision. In this time, Leitón decided to ride his bike to Coronado, Costa Rica to try out for C.S. Uruguay de Coronado. After a week, the coaches at C.S. Uruguay told Leitón to go to the club's office to sign a contract. A few days later, Saprissa's youth coach called Leitón to ask him to sign a contract but he turned them down as he had already signed with C.S. Uruguay.

Club
On August 10, 2017 it was announced that Leitón was to be loaned from C.S. Herediano in the Primera División de Costa Rica to Minnesota United in Major League Soccer through July 10, 2018.

International
In June, 2017 Leitón was chosen the preliminary 40-man roster for Costa Rica's 2017 CONCACAF Gold Cup squad. He was not selected by Óscar Ramírez to participate in the group stage of that tournament, however, he was called up to join the squad for the knockout stage. Leitón earned his first cap for the national team in their 0–2 defeat against the United States in the semi-finals.

References

External links

1993 births
Living people
People from San José Province
Association football wingers
Costa Rican footballers
Costa Rican expatriate footballers
Costa Rica international footballers
2017 CONCACAF Gold Cup players
Puntarenas F.C. players
C.S. Herediano footballers
Minnesota United FC players
Municipal Grecia players
Liga FPD players
Major League Soccer players
Costa Rican expatriate sportspeople in the United States
Expatriate soccer players in the United States